Santiago Cañete (born 18 December 1935) is a Spanish wrestler. He competed in the men's Greco-Roman bantamweight at the 1960 Summer Olympics.

References

External links
 

1935 births
Living people
Spanish male sport wrestlers
Olympic wrestlers of Spain
Wrestlers at the 1960 Summer Olympics
People from Hellín
Sportspeople from the Province of Albacete
20th-century Spanish people